is a Japanese merchandise franchise created by copywriter and Korean Japanese national Kim Sukwon. The Mameshiba are different varieties of beans (and other legumes and nuts) that have dog-like faces and tell trivia. The name is a pun based on the Japanese word for "bean", ; the toy version of the Shiba Inu, called ; and the Japanese word for "trivia", .

Mameshiba became popular through a series of animated interstitials produced by Dentsu that were sold to Japanese television networks to air instead of commercials. Their popularity in Japan and Asia eventually led to their release in the United States via Viz Media, Hot Topic, and some Mameshiba are sold at FYE. They were famous in France thanks to the now-defunct television network Nolife.

Characters

, referred to as "The Scream" in English after the painting to which its face refers.

References

External links
Official website 
Mameshiba World 

Mass media franchises introduced in 2008
Fictional dogs
Dentsu